The nineteenth season of the Dutch TV series Wie is de Mol? ("Who is the Mole?") aired in the winter of 2019. This was the first season with new host and former winner, Rik van de Westelaken. The season took place in Colombia, the eighth country, and seventh season the series had filmed in the Americas, following Canada, Argentina, Mexico, El Salvador, Nicaragua, the Dominican Republic, and the United States respectively. The season premiered on January 5, 2019. Live Finale aired on March 9, 2019 with simulcast in cinemas throughout the Netherlands. During the Finale, Sarah Chronis was declared the winner of the season, earning a grand total of €10,150.-. Chronis, alongside her runner-up Niels Littooij, had successfully unmasked Merel Westrik as the Mole of 2019.

Format
Followed the same format as its Belgian predecessor, the season had ten Dutch celebrities travel to Colombia to complete Assignments to earn money for the group pot. However, one of the ten is the titular Mole (de Mol), the one designated to sabotage the assignments and cause the group to earn the least amount of money for the winner's pot as possible. Every few days, players would take a 20-question multiple choice test about the identity of the Mole. Once the test is complete, the candidates await their results in an Execution ceremony. The candidate with the worst score is executed from the game, while in the event of the tie the candidate who completed their test the slowest is executed. The season plays out until there are three remaining candidates, where they must complete a final test (consisting of 40 questions). The candidate with the highest score, or had completed their test the fastest in a tie, is declared the winner and receives the group's pot.

Jokers, collectible tokens in the series that could correct wrong answers in test, were adapted with for this season. Throughout the season, any Jokers the candidates earned in assignments could be split open to potentially find an Exemption. However, if a Joker is split open, they become void regardless of holding an Exemption or not. Another twist occurred later in the season, where the candidates could gamble in an assignment to earn Jokers or have their next test time reduced to one second. The risk was that they could lose money for the pot, or if they're unlucky enough, two candidates would be executed from the game at the next Execution Ceremony. Some of the candidates lost in their gamble, which caused the second instance in the series' history where two candidates were executed from the game in the same Execution ceremony, the last of which occurred in Season 5.

Candidates

Future appearances
Nikkie de Jager returned for Wie is de Mol? Renaissance in September 2020.

Candidates Progress
The order in which the candidates learned their results are indicated in the table below.

 The candidate is the winner of Wie is de Mol 2019.
 The candidate was unmasked as The Mole 2019.
 The candidate was the losing finalist of Wie is de Mol 2019.
 The candidate saw a Green Screen to proceeded to the next Episode.
 The candidate used an Exemption to automatically proceed to the next Episode.
 The candidate used Jokers for this test, and saw a Green Screen to proceed to the next Episode.
 The candidate used Jokers for this test, however, they did not see a Green Screen before the Executed player saw their Red Screen. Thus they proceeded to the next Episode.
 The candidate did not see a Green Screen before the Executed player saw their Red Screen. Thus they proceeded to the next Episode.
 The candidate was executed from the game and sent home.
Notes

Episodes
For more information, see: List of seasons of "Wie is de Mol?" (in Dutch)

Notes

Season Summary

Episode 1 - Op Sleeptouw

'Over Bruggen' (Over Bridge) - Max. €2,500.-
Arriving in front of a bridge in Colombia, Rik introduces the candidates to their first assignment. Attached to the bridge by rope were 15 chests being dragged by the river current. Ten of these chests held an Exemption for each of the candidates. In 20 minutes, the candidates must retrieve as many chests out of the river and onto the bridge.

After the assignment was over, Rik approached the candidates with an offer. €2,500.- for the group's pot in exchange for all the exemptions the group managed to retrieve in the assignment. Rik also informed the group that if the non-exempt candidates all receive Green Screens, then everyone would proceed to the next episode. The candidates would only find out who had earned exemptions at the first Execution ceremony, if they reject Rik's offer.

The group rejected Rik's offer at the Execution ceremony, and it was revealed that Evelien, Evi, Merel, and Nikkie were the candidates to receive exemptions. The group earned nothing for the pot.

'In Zicht' (In Sight) - Max. €1,000.-
The candidates arrived at a public square with a large group of Salsa dancers performing. Rik informed the group to pay attention to the next performance, during which the candidates were brought in to dance with the performers. After the performance had finished, Rik instructed the candidates that they had a minute to tap their partner that they just danced with. For every correct match, the group would earn €100.- for the pot.

€1,000.- was earned for the pot.

'Rondje Om De Kerk' (Around the Church) - Max. €1,800.-
Hidden throughout the town of Santa Fe were five envelopes with a combined total of €1,800.- for the candidates to find. Using bicycles, they must cycle around the town to find the envelopes. Each bicycle had a tablet attached behind the seat, which displayed the location of the envelopes, which candidates needed to be at the envelope when its collected, and at what time. The tablets would only display the information while their respective bicycles are moving. Any envelopes that are collected by the wrong candidates or at the wrong time do not add money to the pot.

€300.- was earned for the pot.

Episode 2 - Uitgerekend

'Ver Tellen' (Far Count) - Max. €1,200.-
Accompanied to a warehouse courtyard, Rik reminds the group about the Personal Information all the candidates had to fill in before the season began. Scattered around the courtyard are barrels with questions based upon their personal information. Eight candidates must manoeuvre a large wooden block over a board to reveal the numerical answer to each question. The remaining two candidates are stationed on a tower above the courtyard and must take photos of each answer the group presents to them. For every correct and readable answer presented to Rik, €150.- is added to the pot.

€300.- was earned for the pot.

'Uit Stralen' (Out Shine) - Max. €3,500.-
The annual Laser game assignment, one by one, each candidate must navigate through a laser labyrinth, traversing on balance beams to safety platforms to pick up money that is assigned to them. The candidates have ten minutes in the labyrinth, however, if they are struck by a laser, them and the money they collect are out of the assignment.

€650.- was earned for the pot.

'Wachtkamer?' (Waiting Room?) - Max. €2,500.-
The candidates are dividing up into two rooms of duos, and two rooms of trios at the University of Antioquia and to watch films on one screen, and live feeds of the other rooms on a second screen. The films are recordings of the candidates' confessionals where the production had made a series of offers to them. Intervals between confessionals saw offers appear on the film screen offering money for the pot, or Jokers. Each rooms' offers differed from one another, but the candidates could not contact the other rooms during the assignment outside of the livefeeds. Once a candidate has left their room, they are out of the assignment and can not accept any other offers in the assignment. If the candidates remain in their rooms until the end of the film, they lose €250.- per candidate still watching.

€250.- was removed from the pot.

After the assignments, Rik informed the candidates that some of the Jokers this season had exemptions hidden inside of them. At any point, they could use a chisel and hammer to split open their Joker to find out if they held an Exemption. If they break their Joker, the Joker becomes void regardless of its contents or lack thereof.

Episode 3 - Niet Gered

'Vlag Uithangen' (Flag Hanging) - Max. €1,500.-
While visiting one of the local neighbourhoods in Medellín, the candidates are tasked with hanging clothes from the locals along a public staircase in the order of the Colombian flag. Rik assigns each of the group a word in Spanish to help with the assignment. Evelien and Jamie, two candidates who were fluent in Spanish, were removed from the group for the assignment. Rik asks them to predict if the rest of the group will fill up six or more clothing lines, or five or less. If Evelien and Jamie guess correctly, the group earns €1,500.- for the pot.

Evelien and Jamie guessed incorrectly and earned nothing for the pot.

'Jokers Buyout'
Before the start of Stapelgek, Rik offered a single Joker to the candidates for €2,000.- from the pot, or it could be free. If the group manages to decide who receives the Joker within two minutes, nothing is removed from the pot.

The group selected Niels to receive the Joker, therefore nothing was removed from the pot.

'Stapelgek' (Crazy)
After Niels accepts the Joker from Rik, he is instructed to separate himself from the rest of the candidates for the remainder of the assignment at Plaza Mayor. The rest must compete against each other in a match of Jenga to earn Jokers. Taking turns, each candidate must build their jokers by taking out pieces from their Jenga towers. The candidate that ends up causing their match's Jenga tower to fall, loses all Jokers they could have earned while the winner keeps theirs. Three corresponding pieces make a set of Jokers, ranging from one to three. The assignment ends when the last match is complete.

'Op Treden' (Performance) - Max. €2,500.-
Taken to an abandoned Trainyard, the candidates are shown a giant 3D wooden puzzle standing before a series of barriers. The goal is for the 3D puzzle to be carried through the barriers and rebuild on the opposite side for one candidate to climb upon and claim the money. Rik gives the candidates the option to complete the assignment in under 45 minutes for €1,500.- or under 30 minutes for €2,500.-.

The group accomplished the assignment under 27 minutes, despite going for the 45-minute time limit. €1,500.- was earned for the pot.

Episode 4 - Drukker Worden

'Min of Meer' (More or Less) - Max. €2,250.-
Driving further inland from Medellín, the candidates arrive in Guatapé where they are to form four duos, where one duo would become the rescue boat. The other three duos are locked in caged that are towed along the lake from the start to finish. The caged duos have 35 minutes to escape their cages and return to the green start flags to earn money for the pot. If a caged duo either cannot escape before they are towed across the red finish line, or once freed return through the red finish flags, the amount their boat is worth is removed from the pot. The longer time spent in the cages before being freed, the higher amount of money the caged boats are worth. The rescue boat duo had to relay the codes on the outside of the cages to the caged duos.

€500.- was earned for the pot.

'Serenade' - Max. €1,500.-
Arriving at their Hotel in San Gil, the candidates were placed across four different floors. With a local band performing a serenade from the adjacent balconies, the candidates had to find their correct balconies to be standing in by the time the band finishes their performance. On every balcony on the four floors had rules in which the candidates had to follow to find their correct rooms. If the candidates were successful, they would earn €1,500.- for the pot.

The candidates failed the assignment and nothing was earned for the pot.

'Koffiepedia' (Coffee-pedia) - Max. €2,000.-
Spread throughout the grounds of a coffee farm, are four tablet stations with ten questions about coffee each. The candidates had to answer all the questions, using the answers written all over their jumpsuits in 15 minutes. As there were only seven jumpsuits, one candidate was available to assist in reading anyone's jumpsuit. Every correct answer added €50.- for the pot, however, if the candidates enter the wrong answer or incorrect spelling onto a tablet, they would earn €0.- and couldn't answer anymore questions on that tablet.

The candidates failed the assignment and nothing was earned for the pot.

Episode 5 - Verblindend

'Straatbeeld' (Street Scene) - Max. €1,800.-
Hidden throughout the town of Barichara, the candidates formed three groups to search for nine puzzle pieces that would form a picture of the view facing them at the starting point of the assignment. Each group were given envelopes with photographs of the locations to find the puzzle pieces. If the candidates manage to find all the pieces and solve the puzzles in 45 minutes, the candidates will accomplish the assignment.

€1,800.- was earned for the pot.

'Parkeergeld' (Parking Fee)
Returning to a driving school in San Gil, the candidates are shown seven training cars with letters on their roofs, with accompanying parking bays. With two candidates stationed in a tower above the school's courtyard, the group must make five, six, and seven-letter words in the parking bays. Five-letter words earned €50.-; six-letter words earned €100.-; and seven-letter words earned €200.- for the pot. In 45 minutes, the five candidates on the ground can drive the cars, and replace vowels on certain cars, to help the candidates on the tower to form their words.

€1,350.- was earned for the pot.

'Sleutelhanger' (Keychain) - Max. €1,500.-
At the bottom of a local waterfall, the candidates must abseil down to reach two sets of locked boxes. In two teams, the candidates have to feel and memorize their team's corresponding knotted sticks in containers along the abseil for their box's combination lock. Once the two teams have abseiled down to their boxes, each team has one chance to open their box to earn money for the pot. Sinan pulled out of the assignment before it began due to concerns of his weight in the abseil, leaving one team with 2 candidates and the other with 4 candidates.

€750.- was earned for the pot.

Episode 6 - Uithalen

'Steentje Bijdragen' (Doing One's Bit/Contribution) - Max. €2,500.-
Throughout a brick-making factory are five tasks in which the candidates can complete. €250.- can be earned for every completed task, or the candidates may also risk €250.- out of the pot to double their earnings. If they do not complete a task they bet money on in time, €250.- will be removed from the pot. The assignment ends after 30 minutes.

€250.- was removed from the pot.

'Links/Rechts' (Left/Right) - Max. €1,500.-
The candidates have to locate Rik within 15 minutes while riding Tuk Tuks. At the beginning of the assignment, each candidate must select two envelopes to carry with them. If they each arrive in time at Rik's location, whatever is in their envelopes is added to the pot. If they don't, the contents in the envelopes is removed from the pot. An additional restriction is that two candidates can only make left turns, another two could only make right turns, and the last two could only make left-right turns in that order. After the first 15 minutes, the candidates had to stop where they were, and wait for Rik's second location to repeat the assignment for another 15 minutes. All valid envelopes at the end of both assignments adds to the pot, and all invalid envelopes removes money from the pot.

€100.- was removed from the pot.

'Reddingslijn' (Lifeline)
After writing the test, Rik instructed the candidates to split into two sets of trios, informing them that each trio could prevent the other from seeing their results for the test. Hanging across a zipline above San Gil, each candidate had to cross the zipline and take note of the sequence of red and green screens along the line. At the end of their trio's respective zipline the candidates had to replicate the zipline sequence. If a trio were successful in replicating their group's sequence, the other trio would be exempt from the Execution. Again, Sinan pulled out of the assignment due to concerns for his safety due to his weight, and Niels refused based on his fear of heights, leaving both trios down a candidate to complete the assignment

Both teams succeeded in remembering their zipline sequence, and cancelled the episode's Execution ceremony.

Episode 7 - Inhalen

'Getouwtrek' (Tug of War) - Max. €1,500.-
Spread across a beach grove, the candidates had to transfer nine chests to opposite ends of the grove. The candidates could not leave their position across the grove and had to use ropes to pull the chests across the sand. If the candidates manage to have a combined total of chests worth €750.- on either end of the grove within 25 minutes, €1,500.- will be added to the pot.

The group completed the assignment and €1,500.- was earned for the pot.

'Roulette' - Max. €1,500.-
Later in the afternoon, the candidates were tasked by Rik to take one item from a series of boxes along a route. Some of the boxes have money for the pot, while others have other temptations. Before they are allowed to walk the route, Rik gives them a choice between one, two and three Jokers or the ability to have their upcoming test's time be reduced to one second. Choosing one of the four options meant the candidate had to take with them one, two, three or four envelopes with misfortunes, respectively. These envelopes contain €0.-; -€500.-; -€1,000.-; or there will be two Executions at the upcoming test. Once their choice is made, the corresponding positive and negative letters are randomly placed along the route amidst the money for the pot. After all candidates have selected their item, the envelopes' contents are revealed along with any money gathered for the pot.

€2,000.- was removed from the pot, and two candidates would be executed at the next Execution ceremony.

'Geld Oogsten' (Money Harvest) - Max. €1,500.-
Taken to a banana plantation in Dibulla, the candidates were tasked with transporting tagged bundles of bananas to their corresponding colour station using the plantation's transportation methods. After 45 minutes, the candidates were informed that all the bananas designated for the orange station held money for the pot. They had managed to bring 7 out of 12 bundles, and had to search for three tubes filled with €500.- each.

Two tubes were found and €1,000.- was added to the pot.

Episode 8 - Met Zand Strooien

'Vuurproef' (Fire Test) - Max. €1,550.-
The evening after the double Execution, the final four candidates were gathered to the beach for an assignment. Spread crossed the beach were poles with money tokens hanging from them. If the candidates successfully burn all matching pairs of money tokens in 20 minutes, the remaining value of money token is added to the pot.

The candidates failed the assignment and nothing was earned for the pot.

'In Het Vizier' (In the Crosshairs) - Max. €2,000.-
At the nearby Laguna Grande, the candidates were placed in a hunted assignment. Across a deserted stretch of beach are oil barrels with money totaling up to €2,000.- attached to the tops. Using a drone, one of the candidates can assist in directing the others to the correct barrels to collect the money. While the candidates are out in the field, they are tracked down by hunters. Any money in a candidate's possession is removed from the assignment if they are caught by the hunters outside of the safe zone. The candidates have 30 minutes to complete the assignment, or until all the candidates are taken out by the hunters.

€1,250.- was earned for the pot.

'Ten Val Brengen' (Overthrow)
Before the candidates could write their next test, Rik offered up a Joker to be won. Of the two that Rik held, one Joker hid the final Exemption of the season. After making the selection, the Joker is placed upon the top of a pinboard. Taking turns, each candidate could take out a single pin on the board. The candidate that takes out the pin that causes the Joker to fall into the bottom of the board, wins the Joker.

Niels won the Joker and chose to split it open. Inside the Joker, he received the final Exemption of the season.

Episode 9 - Drijfveer

'Stamhoofd' (Headman) - Max. €1,500.-
On the final day before the Final test, the finalists were taken to a river in Santa Marta where instructed to  build three towers along the river shore. Using shuttle boats travelling along the river, they could collect the colour coded wooden blocks from poles in the river and travel to the correct riverbank. If the finalists manage to build one tower, they earn €250.-; two towers, €750.-; and 3 towers, they would earn €1,500.- for the pot. They had 30 minutes to complete the assignment.

The finalists managed to build one tower in time and €250.- was added to the pot.

'Doordraaien' (Keep Spinning) - Max. €1,500.-
The evening before the Final Test, the finalists arrived at a private beach party. As the party's DJs, for their final assignment, the finalists had to perfectly synchronize 2 songs together, with 5 opportunities to earn €300.- for each successful synchronization.

The finalists made two synchronizations and €600.- was added to the pot.

Episode 10 - Wie is de Mol?

The finalists, Merel, Niels, and Sarah were brought out to the live audience in Vondelpark at the Finale for the unmasking of the Mole. Merel revealed herself as the Mole 2019, and shortly after Rik announced that Sarah won the season, with a winning score of 37 out for 40 over Niels' respectable 34. Merel's work as the Mole had Sarah winning the lowest winner's pot of €10,150.- in the series' history, beating Margriet van der Linden's record of €10,500.- in Season 15 by a narrow margin of €350.-.

Mole Sabotage
The following acts of sabotage were revealed at the finale.

Assignment 5 ('Uit Stralen'): Merel stole money from other candidates' stations during her run of the laser labyrinth, meaning they had less money to collect during their turn.

Assignment 12 ('Serenade'): Merel provided the other candidates with incorrect information which ensured they would stop on the wrong balcony.

Assignment 13 ('Koffiepedia'): Merel deliberately entered the wrong answers into two tablets, removing them from play.

Assignment 15 ('Parkeergeld'): Positioned on the top of the tower with Sarah, Merel was responsible for creating the words spelt by the cars. She deliberately decided to spell only 5 letter words which resulted in the least amount of money being earnt.

Assignment 18 ('Links/Rechts'): Merel took envelopes she knew contained the highest amounts of money and swapped the money out of these envelopes for lower amounts that she took during the 'Uit Stralen' challenge. Instead of banking €500.- during the first round, she only handed in €250.-. During the second round, she did not arrive to Rik in time which resulted in €50.- being removed from the pot.

Assignment 22 ('Geld Oogsten'): Merel was in charge of the orange bundles that she knew contained the money the candidates had to find at the conclusion of the challenge. She disposed of five out of the twelve orange bundles by removing their coloured ribbons and hiding them. She also deliberately missed finding a money canister in one of the retrieved orange bundles.

Assignment 23 ('Vuurproef'): Merel selected money tokens and threw them in the fire without another candidate confirming the amount she was disposing of was matching their amount.

Hidden Clues

Reception

Viewing Figures

These Viewer ratings included Delayed Viewing.

References

19
2019 Dutch television seasons
Television shows set in Colombia
Television shows filmed in Colombia